William Joseph Norton (2 November 1900 – 4 December 1963) was an Irish Labour Party politician who served as Tánaiste from 1948 to 1951 and from 1954 to 1957, Leader of the Labour Party from 1932 to 1960, Minister for Social Welfare from 1948 to 1951 and Minister for Industry and Commerce from 1954 to 1957. He was a Teachta Dála (TD) from 1926 to 1927 and from 1932 to 1961.

Norton was born in Dublin in 1900. He joined the postal service in 1916. By 1920, he was a prominent member of the Irish Postal Union and the wider trade union movement in Ireland. From 1924 to 1957, he served as Secretary of the Post Office Workers' Union.

He was elected as a Labour Party TD for Dublin County at a by-election in 1926, but was defeated at the June 1927 general election. On constitutional matters, Norton opposed the introduction into force of the Executive Authority (External Relations) Act 1936 which continued a role for the British King after the King was removed from the Constitution of Ireland. In Norton’s view, the association with the British King should have ended when Edward VIII “voluntarily relinquished his objectionable role here”.

In Professor Tom Garvin's review of the 1950s 'News from a New Republic', he comes in for praise as a moderniser. Garvin places him with a cross party group including Gerard Sweetman and Daniel Morrissey of Fine Gael as well as Seán Lemass of Fianna Fáil who were pushing a modernising agenda. He represented Kildare from 1932 until his death in 1963.

In 1932, he became leader of the Labour Party. In the First Inter-Party Government from 1948 to 1951, Norton became Tánaiste and Minister for Social Welfare. In the Second Inter-Party Government from 1954 to 1957, Norton served as Tánaiste and Minister for Industry and Commerce.

William Norton died in Dublin in 1963. His son Patrick Norton served as a TD for Kildare from 1965 to 1969.

See also
Families in the Oireachtas

References

 

1900 births
1963 deaths
Labour Party (Ireland) TDs
Leaders of the Labour Party (Ireland)
Members of the 4th Dáil
Members of the 7th Dáil
Members of the 8th Dáil
Members of the 9th Dáil
Members of the 10th Dáil
Members of the 11th Dáil
Members of the 12th Dáil
Members of the 13th Dáil
Members of the 14th Dáil
Members of the 15th Dáil
Members of the 16th Dáil
Members of the 17th Dáil
Ministers for Social Affairs (Ireland)
Politicians from County Dublin
Presidential appointees to the Council of State (Ireland)
Tánaistí
Ministers for Enterprise, Trade and Employment